Philipp Förster (born 4 February 1995) is a German professional footballer who plays as a midfielder for  club VfL Bochum.

After playing youth football with Karlsruher SC and VfB Stuttgart, he started his senior career in the Regionalliga Südwest with Waldhof Mannheim in 2014. He joined 2. Bundesliga side 1. FC Nürnberg in January 2017, but failed to make a first-team appearance and joined fellow 2. Bumdesliga side SV Sandhausen later that year. Two years later, he signed for 2. Bundesliga side VfB Stuttgart, and won promotion to the Bundesliga in his first season at the club.

Career

Early career
Förster was born in Bretten, and grew up there, where his parents ran a gardening business. He played youth football for Karlsruher SC until 2010, and later for VfB Stuttgart between 2010 and 2014.

Waldhof Mannheim
In summer 2014, Förster joined Regionalliga Südwest side Waldhof Mannheim on a one-year contract. Shortly before the start of the season, he suffered two muscle tears. He made his debut for Waldhof Mannheim on 24 September 2014 in a 1–1 draw at home to 1899 Hoffenheim II, He scored his first goals for the club on 11 October 2014 with their second and third goals of a 3–1 victory over KSV Hessen Kassel. He appeared in 22 Regionalliga Südwest matches over the course of the 2014–15 season, and scored 4 goals.

In his second season at Waldhof Mannheim, Förster played more regularly, starting 32 of their 34 Regionalliga Südwest matches, in which he scored 6 goals. They finished top of the Regionalliga Südwest after amassing 73 points and qualified for the promotion play-offs. He played in both legs of the promotion play-off against Sportfreunde Lotte as Waldhof Mannheim lost 2–0 on aggregate and failed to achieve promotion to the 3. Liga.

The 2016–17 season saw Förster score twice in 20 appearances for Waldhof. His last appearance for the club came on 13 December 2016 in which he scored as the club defeated FC Homburg 3–2 away from home.

1. FC Nürnberg
On 31 January 2017, Förster joined 2. Bundesliga side 1. FC Nürnberg for an undisclosed fee. After suffering multiple injuries during his spell at the club, he amassed no first team appearances and just four reserve team appearances. He was released by 1. FC Nürnberg on 17 August 2017 to allow him to join SV Sandhausen in his native Baden-Württemberg.

SV Sandhausen
On 17 August 2017, Förster joined fellow 2. Bundesliga side SV Sandhausen on a three-year contract with the option for a further year. He made his debut for the club as a second-half substitute in a 2–1 defeat at home to Fortuna Düsseldorf on 27 August 2017. He scored his first goal for the club on 16 February 2018 in 1–0 away victory over 1. FC Kaiserslautern; he scored from 16 metres in the 79th minute despite slipping as he took the shot. He made 28 appearances and scored three goals for Sandhausen in the 2017–18 season.

The 2018–19 season saw Förster start 29 of Sandhausen 34 2. Bundesliga matches, in which he scored five goals. The first of his five goals came in a 2–1 defeat at home to 1. FC Heidenheim on 2 December 2018 and he scored a brace for the club on 16 March 2019 in a 4–0 victory over FC St. Pauli. On 24 July 2019, he signed a two-year contract extension with Sandhausen, keeping him at the club until summer 2022. He appeared five times and scored once with Sandhausen in the 2019–20 season before joining VfB Stuttgart.

VfB Stuttgart
On 2 September 2019, Förster signed a four-year-deal with VfB Stuttgart for a fee estimated to be around €3,000,000. After making his debut for the club on 14 September 2019 in a 3–2 victory over Jahn Regensburg, he scored his first goal for the club on 21 September 2019 in a 2–0 victory at home to Greuther Fürth. He appeared in 26 league matches and scored 3 goals for Stuttgart across the 2019–20 season, as they finished second and were promoted to the Bundesliga.

After suffering an ankle injury during the build-up to the 2020–21 season, Förster made his Bundesliga debut as a substitute in second-half stoppage time of a 1–1 draw with Schalke 04 on 30 October 2020. He made his first Bundesliga start on 28 November 2019 as a replacement for the injured Daniel Didavi in a 3–1 defeat to Bayern Munich.

Bochum
On 1 July 2022, Förster joined VfL Bochum on a two-year contract.

Career statistics

References

External links
 
 

1995 births
Living people
German footballers
People from Bretten
Sportspeople from Karlsruhe (region)
Footballers from Baden-Württemberg
Association football midfielders
SV Waldhof Mannheim players
1. FC Nürnberg II players
1. FC Nürnberg players
SV Sandhausen players
VfB Stuttgart players
VfL Bochum players
Bundesliga players
2. Bundesliga players
Regionalliga players